The EF28-200mm f/3.5-5.6 USM lens was a superzoom lens made by Canon Inc.

The lens has an EF-type mount, which fits the Canon EOS line of cameras. Due to its big focal range, it is useful for travel photography. One review rated the image quality of this lens as poor.

This lens has covered roughly the same focal length range for 35 mm (full frame) like the EF-S 18–135mm lens is currently covering for cropped sensor (35 mm equivalent focal length: 29–216mm). The EF-S 18–135mm lens is one of the standard lenses, often sold with Canon EF-S cameras as bundle. Currently a similar lenses are available for cameras with Canon EF lens mount only from third party manufacturers. Available Canon lenses, which have the closest focal length are e.g. the EF 28–300mm lens, which is much heavier, or the EF 70–200mm f/4L.

Specifications

References 

28-200mm lens